Heinz Isler (July 26, 1926 – June 20, 2009) was a Swiss structural engineer. He is famous for his thin concrete shells.

Early life and education
Heinz Isler was born in the municipality of Zollikon. He showed talent as an artist as a student, but his father advised him to seek a career in engineering first. Isler studied thin concrete shells at the Federal Institute of Technology (ETH) in Zurich.

Career
Upon graduating from the ETH in 1950 with a degree in civil engineering, Isler worked as a teaching assistant with Pierre Lardy, a professor at the ETH, from 1951 to 1953. He opened his own office in 1954 in Burgdorf, Switzerland. His first project as a shellbuilder was a concert hall roof for the Hotel Kreuz in Langenthal which was completed between 1954 and 1955. The form of the shell was loosely inspired by the shape of a plumped-up pillow on his bed.

Death
Isler died from a stroke on June 20, 2009 at the age of 82.

Bibliography

See also
 Christian Menn
 Othmar H. Ammann
 Robert Maillart

References

External links

 Heinz Isler information at Structurae
 Heinz Isler and Structural art

1926 births
2009 deaths
ETH Zurich alumni
Swiss civil engineers
Structural engineers
People from Meilen District